Jackie McLean meets Junko Onishi Hat Trick is an album by American jazz alto saxophonist Jackie McLean, released in May 1996 on somethin`else (Toshiba EMI).

Track listing

Personnel
Jackie McLean - Alto saxophone
Junko Onishi - Piano
Nat Reeves - Bass
Lewis Nash - Drums

Production
Executive Producer - Hitoshi Namekata
Co-Producer - Jackie McLean
Recording and Mixing Engineer - Jim Anderson
Assistant Engineer - Barbara Lipke
Mastering engineer - Yoshio Okazaki
Cover Photograph - Jimmy Katz
Art director - Kaoru Taku
A&R - Yoshiko Tsuge

References

External links
 

1996 albums
Jackie McLean albums
Junko Onishi albums